Jindřichovice pod Smrkem is a municipality and village in Liberec District in the Liberec Region of the Czech Republic. It has about 600 inhabitants.

Administrative parts
The village of Dětřichovec is an administrative part of Jindřichovice pod Smrkem.

Geography
It lies in the Frýdlant Hills. The Jindřichovický Stream flows through the municipality.

History

The first written mention of Jindřichovice pod Smrkem is from 1381.

Transport
There is a road border crossing with Poland Jindřichovice pod Smrkem / Świecie.

Sights
Notable is the ruin of the Church of Saint James the Great. It was a late Romanesque church from the second half of the 13th century.

Twin towns – sister cities

Jindřichovice pod Smrkem is twinned with:
 Świeradów-Zdrój, Poland

References

External links

Villages in Liberec District